Sweden will compete at the 2018 Winter Paralympics in Pyeongchang, South Korea, held between 9–18 March 2018. They sent a team of 21 participants in 5 sports.

Medalists

Competitors 
The following is the list of number of competitors participating at the Games per sport.

Alpine skiing 

Men

Biathlon 

Men

Cross-country skiing

Men's distance

Sprint

Para ice hockey

Summary

Roster: Daniel Cederstam, Maximillian Gyllsten, Christian Hedberg, Markus Holm, Kenth Jonsson, Göran Karlsson, Per Kasperi, Niklas Ingvarsson, Rasmus Lundgren, Martin Magnevill, Robin Meng, Andreas Nejman, Peter Nilsson, Ulf Nilsson, Peter Ojala, Niklas Rakos, Anders Wistrand

Preliminary round

5–8th place semifinal

Seventh place game

Wheelchair curling

Summary

Round-robin
Sweden has a bye in draws 1, 3, 8, 11, 13 and 15.

Draw 2
Saturday, 10 March, 19:35

Draw 4
Sunday, 11 March, 14:35

Draw 5
Sunday, 11 March, 19:35

Draw 6
Monday, 12 March, 09:35

Draw 7
Monday, 12 March, 14:35

Draw 9
Tuesday, 13 March, 09:35

Draw 10
Tuesday, 13 March, 14:35

Draw 12
Wednesday, 14 March, 9:35

Draw 14
Wednesday, 14 March, 19:35

Draw 16
Thursday, 15 March, 14:35

Draw 17
Thursday, 15 March, 19:35

See also
 Sweden at the 2018 Winter Olympics

Notes

References

Nations at the 2018 Winter Paralympics
2018
2018 in Swedish sport